The Elizabeth River runs through Essex and Union counties, New Jersey in the United States for  before draining into the Arthur Kill.

Course
The headwaters of the Elizabeth are in East Orange in Essex County. The river rises in an urban area at the border between Irvington and the Vailsburg neighborhood of Newark. It flows in a generally southern direction through the center of Irvington in a concrete channel with masonry walls built in the 1920s and 30s passing along the east side of Civic Square. Further south, it forms the west boundary of the 19th century Clinton Cemetery. At the southern end of the cemetery, the river passes under the Garden State Parkway near Exit 143 and disappears as a surface waterway.

The Elizabeth River reemerges just south of the Union County line near Garden State Parkway Interchange 142 between Union and Hillside. After passing under I-78 it runs through the Elizabeth River Parkway. Here, the river is joined on its left bank by its first significant tributary, Lightning Brook.  The Elizabeth River then flows under the Garden State Parkway again.  After passing under US 22, the river turns eastward and is joined by the West Branch Elizabeth River.  The river then flows past historic Liberty Hall and Kean University. Much of the river is contained by levees in this section.

At the bridge on the South Front Street it flows into the Arthur Kill.

Elizabeth River Parkway

The Elizabeth River Parkway is a set of parklands that hugs the river from Hillside through Elizabeth It was designed in for the Union County Parks Commission in the 1920s by the historic firm Olmsted Brothers, and is one of the three "emerald necklaces" in the county park system, the others being Rahway River Parkway and Passaic River Parkway. The firm also designed Warinanco Park

Elizabeth River Trail
The Elizabeth River Trail is a project to construct a park and riverside trail from South Broad Street in Downtown Elizabeth to the river's outlet into the Arthur Kill, a distance of  miles. Phase I, between Broad and Bridge streets near St. John's Parsonage, opened in 2012. Phase II was completed and opened in August 2018.

Crossings
This list is for the crossings in Union County

This list is for the crossings in Essex County from Union County line to source

See also
List of rivers of New Jersey
East Coast Greenway
Geography of New York–New Jersey Harbor Estuary

References 

Rivers of Essex County, New Jersey
Rivers of New Jersey
Rivers of Union County, New Jersey
Geography of Elizabeth, New Jersey